Legislative elections were held in South Korea on 27 February 1973 to elect 146 members of the National Assembly. Another 73 members appointed by President Park Chung-hee were indirectly elected by the National Conference for Unification on 7 March 1973.

The result was a supermajority victory for the ruling Democratic Republican Party, which won 73 of the 146 elected seats in the National Assembly along with the 73 seats filled by Park's appointees. Voter turnout was 72.9%.

The election reconstituted the National Assembly after Park had dissolved it in the October Restoration self-coup four months earlier and pushed through a constitutional referendum which removed presidential term limits and gave him the power to appoint one-third of the National Assembly. The opposition New Democratic Party had also split in 1972 over a leadership dispute between the Yu Chin-san faction and an opposing faction led by Kim Dae-jung and Kim Hong-il. However, the DUP performed poorly and split the opposition vote, and in the aftermath the members expressed regret for their decision to run.

Results

By city/province

Presidential appointees 
On 7 March 1973, the National Conference for Unification indirectly elected 73 members of the National Assembly appointed by President Park Chung-hee. The number of delegates present was 2,354, with 2,251 delegates approving the election of Park's appointees.

By city/province

References

Legislative elections in South Korea
South Korea
Legislative